Maria José Gonzaga (September 3, 1926 Manhuaçu – July 24, 2008), known as Zezé Gonzaga, was a Brazilian singer and entertainer. She died on July 24, 2008, in the city of Rio de Janeiro at the age of 81.

References

External links 
 Globo: Singer Zezé Gonzaga dies at 81 

1926 births
2008 deaths
People from Minas Gerais
20th-century Brazilian women singers
20th-century Brazilian singers